Payr is a surname. Notable people with this surname include:

 Anna Payr (born 1981), Hungarian sailor
 Erwin Payr (1871–1946), Austrian-German surgeon
 Hugó Payr (1888–1976), Hungarian wrestler

See also
 Parr (surname)